Kazbekovsky District is an administrative and municipal district (raion), one of the forty-one in the Republic of Dagestan, Russia. It is located in the west of the republic. Its administrative center is the rural locality (a selo) of Dylym. As of the 2010 Census, the total population of the district was 42,752, with the population of Dylym accounting for 20.2% of that number.

Geography
The district is in rugged terrain in the forested foothills of Degestan, 50 km west of the Caspian Sea.  The average height is 500 to 1,000 meters above sea level, with higher elevations reaching 1,900 meters.  There are many river valleys, canyons, and gulleys cutting the landscape with fast-moving streams.  The largest river, the Aktash River, flows from southeast to northwest through the district.

Administrative and municipal status
Within the framework of administrative divisions, Kazbekovsky District is one of the forty-one in the Republic of Dagestan. It is divided into one settlement (an administrative division with the administrative center in the urban-type settlement (an inhabited locality) of Dubki) and three selsoviets, which comprise fifteen rural localities. As a municipal division, the district is incorporated as Kazbekovsky Municipal District. The settlement is incorporated as an urban settlement, and the three selsoviets are incorporated as eleven rural settlements within the municipal district. The selo of Dylym serves as the administrative center of both the administrative and municipal district.

References

Notes

Sources

Districts of Dagestan
